Wit is a 2001 American television drama film directed by Mike Nichols. The teleplay by Nichols and Emma Thompson is based on the 1999 Pulitzer Prize-winning play of the same title by Margaret Edson.

The film was shown at the Berlin International Film Festival on February 9, 2001 before being broadcast by HBO on March 24. It was shown at the Edinburgh Film Festival and the Warsaw Film Festival later in the year.

Plot
Vivian Bearing is a professor of English literature known for her intense knowledge of metaphysical poetry, especially the Holy Sonnets of John Donne. Her life takes a turn when she is diagnosed with metastatic Stage IV ovarian cancer. Oncologist Harvey Kelekian prescribes various chemotherapy treatments to treat her disease, and as she suffers through the various side-effects (such as fever, chills, vomiting, and abdominal pain), she attempts to put everything in perspective. The story periodically flashes back to previous moments in her life, including her childhood, her graduate school studies, and her career prior to her diagnosis. During the course of the film, she continually breaks the fourth wall by looking into the camera and expressing her feelings.

As she grows increasingly ill, Vivian agrees to undergo more tests and experimental treatments, even though she realizes the doctors treating her, including former student Jason Posner, see her less as someone to save and more as a guinea pig for their treatments. The only person who seems to care for her as a person is Susie Monahan, one of the nurses on the staff.

Late in Vivian's illness, the only visitor she receives in the hospital is her former graduate school professor and mentor, Evelyn Ashford, who reads her excerpts from Margaret Wise Brown's The Runaway Bunny. As she nears the end of her life, Vivian manages to maintain her dignity and wit even as she is finally confronted with her own frailty and need for compassion.

Vivian dies at the end of the film, with her voiceover reciting "death be not proud".

Cast
 Emma Thompson as Vivian Bearing, Ph.D.
 Christopher Lloyd as Dr. Harvey Kelekian
 Eileen Atkins as Evelyn Ashford, Ph.D.
 Audra McDonald as Susie Monahan, R.N.
 Jonathan M. Woodward as Dr. Jason Posner
 Harold Pinter as Mr. Bearing

Production
In preparation for the role of Vivian Bearing, Emma Thompson shaved her head, following in the footsteps of actresses such as Kathleen Chalfant and Judith Light, who had performed the role on stage.

The film was shot at the Pinewood Studios in London.

The soundtrack includes a number of classical pieces, including the Serenade Adagio from Dmitri Shostakovich's String Quartet No. 15, Spiegel im Spiegel by Arvo Pärt, the second movement of Henryk Mikolaj Gorecki's Symphony No. 3 (Symphony of Sorrowful Songs), and The Unanswered Question by Charles Ives.

Reception

Critical response
The film was received with general acclaim. On Rotten Tomatoes it has a score of 83% based on reviews from 12 critics.

Eddie Cockrell of Variety called the film "shrewd and triumphant" and "focused, emotionally draining and ultimately inspiring" and added, "The risks in filming such a theatrical experience are enormous, yet the original material has been carefully and smartly reworked for the screen by Thompson and Nichols . . . Subtle yet crucial shifts from theatrical to film conventions abound, reaffirming Thompson's skill as both writer and actress . . . as well as Nichols' proven track record with theatrical properties."

Caryn James of The New York Times observed, "Emma Thompson gives one of her most brilliant performances as Vivian Bearing...Mr. Nichols and Ms. Thompson, who wrote the script together, have made minimal changes to the play, but those amount to a major transformation. They have preserved Ms. Edson's language and intense focus on Vivian's hospital room as she endures eight months of brutal experimental chemotherapy for ovarian cancer. But Mr. Nichols's visual choices turn this into a fluent, gripping television film...The hospital staff around her is played beautifully by actors who escape the hazards of clichés. As Jason, a young doctor proud of the A minus he once got in Vivian's poetry course, Jonathan M. Woodward makes his character's callowness and insensitivity believable. As Susie, the nurse whose total compassion makes her Jason's opposite, Audra McDonald is especially impressive because the character could so easily have been treated with condescension...E. M. Ashford is played with unerring delicacy by Eileen Atkins in a performance that matches Ms. Thompson's brilliance.... [L]et's not pretend that Wit is fun or necessarily soothing; frankly, it is depressing. But if you miss this version, you will also miss a rare experience."

In his July 3, 2008 blog, Roger Ebert recalled naming Wit one of the year's best on his Best Films of 2001 program with Richard Roeper, even though it never opened theatrically. He described it as "both intelligent and heartbreaking" and called Emma Thompson's performance "her best work on film." He said when he tried to watch the DVD in later years, he discovered "I actually could not watch the movie. I remembered it too clearly, perhaps, and dreaded re-living it. When I reviewed it, its situation was theoretical for me, and I responded to the honesty and emotion of the drama. Since then, I have had cancer, and had all too many hours, days and weeks of hospital routine robbing me of my dignity. Although people in my situation are always praised for their courage, actually courage has nothing to do with it. There is no choice."

Critics from The A.V. Club, New York Magazine, Los Angeles Times, San Francisco Chronicle and The Wall Street Journal, among others, also praised the film and its performances. Nichols' direction was lauded in many reviews as well.

Accolades
 Golden Globe Award for Best Mini-Series Or Motion Picture Made for Television (nominee)
 Golden Globe Award for Best Performance by an Actress In A Mini-series or Motion Picture Made for Television (Emma Thompson, nominee)
 Primetime Emmy Award for Outstanding Made for Television Movie (winner)
 Primetime Emmy Award for Outstanding Directing for a Miniseries, Movie or a Special (Mike Nichols, winner)
 Outstanding Single Camera Picture Editing for a Miniseries, Movie or a Special (John Bloom, winner) 
 Primetime Emmy Award for Outstanding Lead Actress - Miniseries or a Movie (Emma Thompson, nominee)
 Primetime Emmy Award for Outstanding Supporting Actress - Miniseries or a Movie (Audra McDonald, nominee)
 Primetime Emmy Award for Outstanding Writing for a Miniseries, Movie or a Dramatic Special (Emma Thompson and Mike Nichols, nominees)
 Primetime Emmy Award for Outstanding Casting - Miniseries, Movie, or a Special (Ellen Lewis, Juliet Taylor and Leo Davis, nominees)
 Screen Actors Guild Award for Outstanding Performance by a Female Actor in a Miniseries or Television Movie (Emma Thompson, nominee)
 2001 Humanitas Prize (winner)
 2001 Peabody Award (winner)
 Berlin International Film Festival Special Prize of the Ecumenical Jury (Mike Nichols, winner''')
 Berlin International Film Festival Golden Bear for Best Motion Picture (nominee)

Home media
HBO Home Video released the film in 16:9 format on DVD on September 11, 2001.

References

External links

 
 

2001 television films
2001 films
2001 drama films
American films based on plays
American drama television films
Films about academia
Films about cancer
Films about death
Films about educators
Films directed by Mike Nichols
Films shot at Pinewood Studios
Films with screenplays by Emma Thompson
HBO Films films
Films set in hospitals
Medical-themed films
Peabody Award-winning broadcasts
Primetime Emmy Award for Outstanding Made for Television Movie winners
2000s American films